is a Japanese professional footballer who plays as a right back for Hannover 96 in the 2. Bundesliga and for the Japanese national team.

Club career

FC Tokyo
Muroya was born in Osaka. He joined FC Tokyo in 2016 and made his league debut against Ventforet Kofu on 9 July 2016.

Hannover 96
In August 2020, Muroya joined German club Hannover 96.

International career 
In June 2011, Muroya was elected Japan U-17 national team for 2011 U-17 World Cup and he played 4 matches. He has been a member of the Japan national U-23 team since 2015. Muroya was member of Japan U23 team for 2016 AFC U-23 Championship in Qatar and he won the championship. On 1 July 2016, Muroya was called up for the 2016 Summer Olympics.

Career statistics

Club

International

Honours

International
Japan U-23
AFC U-23 Championship: 2016

Japan
AFC Asian Cup runner-up: 2019

Individual
 J.League Best XI: 2019

References

External links

Living people
1994 births
People from Kumatori, Osaka
Meiji University alumni
Association football people from Osaka Prefecture
Association football defenders
Japanese footballers
Japan youth international footballers
J1 League players
J3 League players
2. Bundesliga players
FC Tokyo players
FC Tokyo U-23 players
Hannover 96 players
Footballers at the 2016 Summer Olympics
Olympic footballers of Japan
Japan international footballers
2019 AFC Asian Cup players
Footballers at the 2014 Asian Games
Asian Games competitors for Japan